Evil Superstars was a Belgian indie rock band led by Mauro Pawlowski. Among its members was Millionaire and Eagles of Death Metal guitarist Tim Vanhamel.

History
Evil Superstars was formed in 1992 in Heusden-Zolder, Belgium.
The original members were:
 Mauro Pawlowski, vocals and guitar
 Marc Requilé, samples and keyboards
 Bart Vandebroek, bass guitar
 Bart Vandeput, drums
Johan Van Den Berghe soon replaced Bart Vandeput on drums.

In March 1994 the band finished first in Humo's Rock Rally contest. Three months later Johan Van Den Berghe left, and was replaced by Dave Schroyen before the recording of their first EP, Hairfacts (1995). Tim Vanhamel, aged fifteen, joined the band.

In 1996 this line-up recorded their first album Love Is Okay, soon followed by a second EP Remix Apocalyps. The second album Boogie Children-R-US was recorded in 1997, but record company Paradox, a A&M London subsidiary, postponed the official release for a year. Despite favorable reviews, sales were poor. When A&M London fell apart, the band found itself without a record company and Mauro Pawlowski decided to disband the Evil Superstars.

Evil Superstars gave their last concert on September 15, 1998 at the Botanique in Brussels.

Members
 Mauro Pawlowski, vocals and guitar
 Marc Requilé, samples and keyboards
 Bart Vandebroek, bass guitar
 Bart Vandeput, Johan Van Den Berghe, Dave Schroyen, drums
 Tim Vanhamel, guitar

Gallery

Discography

Albums
 1996 : Love Is Okay
 1998 : Boogie Children-R-Us

EPs
 1994 : Hairfacts
 1996 : Remix apocalyps

Singles
 1996 : "Satan is in my ass"
 1996 : "Pantomiming with her parents"
 1998 : "B.A.B.Y."
 1998 : "Sad sad planet"

Soundtracks
 Oh Girl, from Lock, Stock and Two Smoking Barrels (1998), Guy Ritchie
 Holy Spirit Come Home, from Any Way the Wind Blows (2003), Tom Barman

References

External links
 Official website

Belgian alternative rock groups
Belgian experimental musicians
Belgian rock music groups
Musical groups established in 1992
Musical groups disestablished in 1998